Martin Edmondson (born March 20, 1944) is an American sports shooter. He competed in the men's 50 metre running target event at the 1976 Summer Olympics.

References

1944 births
Living people
American male sport shooters
Olympic shooters of the United States
Shooters at the 1976 Summer Olympics
Sportspeople from San Antonio